Eschberg is a part of Saarbrücken, the capital of Saarland and has a population of 7,000 residents.

History
In year 1400, there was a farm owned by a man called Espergers Hensel. The city acquired the Eschberg area in 1937. It is the newest part of Saarbrücken. The first houses were built in 1953. Since 1963, Eschberg has been a residential area.

Demographics
1965: 6,700
1975: 7,100
1985: 8,100
1995: 7,800
2005: 6,900
2010: 7,000

References

Saarbrücken